Wittenberg (Low Saxon: Wittenbarg; meaning White Mountain; officially Lutherstadt Wittenberg (Luther City Wittenberg)), is the fourth largest town in Saxony-Anhalt, Germany.

Wittenberg is famous for its close connection with Martin Luther and the Protestant Reformation, for which it received the honourific Lutherstadt. Several of Wittenberg's buildings are associated with the events, including a preserved part of the Augustinian monastery in which Luther lived, first as a monk and later as owner with his wife Katharina von Bora and family, considered to be the world's premier museum dedicated to Luther. Wittenberg was also the seat of the Elector of Saxony, a dignity held by the dukes of Saxe-Wittenberg, making it one of the most powerful cities in the Holy Roman Empire.

Today, Wittenberg is an industrial centre and popular tourist destination, best known for its intact historic center and various memorial sites dedicated to Martin Luther and Philip Melanchthon. The buildings associated with those two figures were added to the UNESCO World Heritage list in 1996, along with other sites in Eisleben, because of their religious significance and testimony to one of the most influential movements of medieval Europe.

History

Historical documents first mention the settlement in 1180 as a small village founded by Flemish colonists under the rule of the House of Ascania. In 1260 this village became the residence of the dukes of Saxe-Wittenberg, and in 1293 the settlement was granted its town charter as a free-standing town.

Wittenberg developed into an important trade centre during the following several centuries, because of its central location. When the local branch of the Ascanians died out in 1422, control of Saxe-Wittenberg passed to the House of Wettin. This town became an important regional political and cultural centre at the end of the 15th century, when Frederick III "the Wise", the Elector of Saxony from 1486 to 1525, made his residence in Wittenberg. Several parts of boundaries of the town were extended soon afterward. The second bridge over the Elbe River was built from 1487 through 1490 and the castle church (the Schlosskirche in German) was erected from 1496 through 1506. The Elector's palace was rebuilt at the same time.

In 1502 Elector Frederick founded the University of Wittenberg, which attracted some important thinkers, such as Martin Luther—a professor of theology beginning in 1508—and Philipp Melanchthon—a professor of Greek starting in 1518.

On 31 October 1517, according to legend, Luther nailed his 95 theses against the selling of indulgences at the door of the All Saints', the Castle Church – an event taken as marking the beginning of the Protestant Reformation. The Anabaptist movement had one of its earliest homes in Wittenberg, when the Zwickau prophets moved there in late 1521, only to be suppressed by Luther when he returned from the Wartburg in spring 1522.

The Capitulation of Wittenberg (1547) is the name given to the treaty by which John Frederick the Magnanimous was compelled to resign the electoral dignity and most of his territory to the Albertine branch of the House of Wettin.

In 1760, during the Seven Years' War, the Austrians bombarded the Prussian-occupied town. The French took control in 1806, and Napoleon commanded the refortification of the town in 1813. In 1814 the Prussian Army under Tauentzien stormed Wittenberg; he received the title of "von Wittenberg" as a reward. In 1815 Wittenberg became part of Prussia, administered within the Province of Saxony. Wittenberg continued to be a fortress of the third class until the reorganisation of German defences after the foundation of the new German Empire led to its dismantling in 1873.

It contained a prisoner of war camp from 1914 to 1918. A camp 10½ acres in area was set up at Klein Wittenberg, 2 miles from the city. Eight compounds held 13,000 men. During the typhus epidemic of 1914–1915, conditions were harsh. The camp medical officer, Dr. Aschenbach, was awarded the Iron Cross for his part in the epidemic. The award was questioned by the Allies.
The use of dogs to attack POW's was criticised by American Ambassador James W. Gerard in his book "Four Years in Germany".

Unlike many other historic German cities during World War II, Wittenberg's town centre was spared destruction during the conflict. The Allies agreed not to bomb Wittenberg, though fighting took place in the town, with bullet pock-marks visible on the statues of Luther and Melanchthon at the market square – or so the popular version of the town's history goes. In actuality, the Luther statue was not even present in the town square during much of the war, but in storage at Luther Brunnen, a roadhouse a few kilometres north of the town.

Wittenberg's reputation as a town protected from Allied bombing is largely accurate. However, just outside Wittenberg the government had built the Arado Flugzeugwerke (the Arado Aircraft Factory), which produced components of airplanes for the Luftwaffe. This war factory was worked by Jews, Russians, Poles, political prisoners and even a few Americans—all prisoners engaging in forced labour, including POW's who were supposed to be exempt from this sort of labor. American and British planes bombed the factory near the end of the war, and in destroying it killed over one thousand of the prisoners and POW's placed by the Germans in this war plant. The 1995 publication of "...und morgen war Krieg!" by Renate Gruber-Lieblich
attempts to document this tragic bombing outside Wittenberg.

In 1945, Wittenberg issued 19 of its own postage stamps, each depicting Hitler but with a large black round overprint covering his face. At the end of the war, Soviet forces occupied Wittenberg; it became part of East Germany in 1949. During the East German period, it formed part of Halle District. By means of the peaceful revolution in 1989, the communist régime dissolved and the town has been governed democratically since 1990.

Wittenberg is currently characterized by renovation and new construction work, an economic recovery and tourism development as a "place of pilgrimage for the Reformation". With the Luther Decade starting in 2008, the city began preparing for the 500th anniversary of the Reformation, which took place in 2017. Numerous buildings have been restored, the infrastructure has been partially renewed and numerous new attractions have been created in the city (e.g. the new Lutherstadt Wittenberg Hauptbahnhof, Arsenal shopping centre, Luthergarden or the Panometer) .

In 2014 Lutherstadt Wittenberg was awarded the honorary title European City of the Reformation by the Community of Protestant Churches in Europe.

Historical population 
The figures are given for the metropolitan district at the point in time. Up to 1791 the figures are generally estimated, later figures are from census or local authorities.

from 2012 census.

Divisions 
The town Wittenberg consists of Wittenberg proper and the following Ortschaften or municipal divisions:

 Abtsdorf
 Apollensdorf
 Boßdorf
 Griebo
 Kropstädt
 Mochau
 Nudersdorf
 Pratau
 Reinsdorf
 Schmilkendorf
 Seegrehna
 Straach

Sights and culture 

Lutherstadt Wittenberg has a wide range of cultural sites. Most are located within the historic old town along the Wittenberg Culture Mile.

Wittenberg is home to numerous historical sites, as well as portraits and other paintings by Lucas Cranach the Elder and Younger. On the doors of All Saints' Church, the Schlosskirche ("castle church", built in 1496–1506) Martin Luther is said to have nailed his 95 theses in 1517. It was seriously damaged by fire in 1760 during a bombardment by the French during the Seven Years' War, was practically rebuilt, and was later (1885–1892) restored. The wooden doors, burnt in 1760, were replaced in 1858 by bronze doors, bearing the Latin text of the theses. Inside the church are the tombs of Martin Luther, Philipp Melanchthon, Johannes Bugenhagen, Paul Eber and of the electors Frederick the Wise (by Peter Vischer the Younger, 1527) and John the Constant (by Hans Vischer), and portraits of the reformers by Lucas Cranach the Younger, who is also buried in the church.

St. Mary's Church, the parish church in which Luther often preached, was built in the 14th century, but has been much altered since Luther's time. It contains a painting by Lucas Cranach the Elder, representing the Last Supper (with the faces of Luther and other reformers), Baptism and Confession, also a font by Hermann Vischer the Elder (1457). In addition, there are numerous historic paintings in the church.

The ancient electoral palace is another of the buildings that suffered severely in 1760; it now contains archives.

Martin Luther's home, the Lutherhaus, where he studied and lived both before and after the Reformation, is now a museum containing many artifacts from his life. Melanchthon's house and the house of Lucas Cranach the Elder, mayor of Wittenberg, can also be found here. Statues of Luther (by Schadow), Melanchthon and Bugenhagen embellish the town. The spot outside the Elster Gate where Luther publicly burned the papal bull in 1520 is marked by an oak tree.

The original Wittenberg University quadrangle also lies in the city centre.

Buildings

Churches

Schlosskirche 
One of the town's main attractions is the Schlosskirche (Castle Church), most notably associated with the publication of Martin Luther's 95 Theses, a bold attack on the Roman Catholic Church's practice of indulgences. The castle church was remodelled between 1883 and 1892. According to the intentions of the builders, the world-historical significance of the castle church was to be expressed. In the spirit of the historicism period, the statement was related to the precursors and bearers of the Reformation, thus creating a Reformation memorial. On the occasion of the 500th anniversary of the posting of the theses in 2017, the church was extensively renovated.

Stadtkirche Wittenberg 
St. Mary's Town Church and Parish Church is the mother church of the Reformation. The first Protestant service was held in it in 1521 by Justus Jonas the Elder and Andreas Bodenstein of Karlstadt. As Martin Luther's preaching church, it was the Reformation official church of the general superintendents of the Saxon Kurkreis. After the Congress of Vienna it became the official residence of the Wittenberg superintendents. The artistic decoration is well preserved and includes works by Lucas Cranach the Elder and Lucas Cranach the Younger. Epitaphs on the interior and exterior walls refer to the work of many important personalities. The cemetery chapel of the Holy Corpse stands to the south of the town church and once belonged to the walled cemetery area of the church.

Unbefleckte Empfängnis Catholic Church 
The church on Mauerstraße was consecrated in 1872 by Bishop Konrad Martin. It was renovated in 1999/2000.

Christ Church 
Christ Church was built as another church in 1907/1908 in the suburb of Kleinwittenberg in historicist forms.

Other buildings

Augusteum and Luther House 
The representative showcase building Augusteum was once an extension of the University of Wittenberg "Leucorea". In the inner courtyard of the Augusteum is the former home of Martin Luther. Today, the building houses the Reformation History Museum with its collections of pictures, writings and contemporary exhibits from the Reformation era. During the renovation of the Luther House, its medieval charm was partially lost.

Melanchthon House 
The architectural style of the Melanchthon House in Collegienstraße, which expresses the self-confident modernity of the Renaissance, is an architectural sight. In this house lived and died the reformer Philipp Melanchthon lived and died in this house. It houses an exhibition. In 2013, the house received an extension according to plans by the architects Dietsch & Weber from Halle made of grey brick.

University Leucorea Wittenberg 
Founded in 1502, the University of Leucorea in Collegienstraße was and is not only a teaching institution. For example, the famous personalities of the Reformation Martin Luther and Philipp Melanchthon spent time here. Over the history of the university, which is rich in tradition, developments took place that had an impact not only on Germany but also on large parts of the world.

Hamlethaus 
The Hamlethaus in Collegienstraße blends into the ensemble of the town.

Bugenhagenhaus 
The Bugenhagen House next to the town church is the oldest Protestant vicarage in the world and is one of the most significant memorials to the Reformation. Until 1997, it was the residence and place of work of the Wittenberg superintendents without interruption since the Reformation. Johannes Bugenhagen was the first pastor to live here until his death in 1558. Between 2004 and 2007, the building was thoroughly renovated and now serves as a spiritual community and meeting centre.

Stadthaus 
The Stadthaus is a modern building complex on Arsenalplatz that includes several historic buildings. Their origins date back to the 13th century. The town house contains significant remains of the medieval building fabric of the former monastery church of the Franciscans, which in turn was used as the burial place of the Ascanians. As early as 1536, the building was converted into a granary by Conrad Theiß and heavily remodelled by adding several levels. The medieval windows were closed and pouring openings were installed. During the Seven Years' War, the building was severely damaged and rebuilt with a lower building height. Several building activities in the following period have greatly changed the appearance of the building. At the end of the 19th century, for example, one storey was added and large window openings were broken in on the south side. Between 1945 and 1992, Arsenal Square with the town house was occupied by the Red Army and therefore inaccessible. On the site of the former Franciscan monastery, the city's Central Visitors' Reception was opened in 2014/2015. It includes the event centre Stadthaus, the Historical City Information, the Council Archive and the Tourist and City Information Centre.

Altes Rathaus and Marktplatz 
In the centre of the old town is the generously proportioned market square, where a harmonious ensemble of town houses has grown up over the centuries. On it are the Renaissance town hall, the monuments to Martin Luther (designed by Schadow) and Philipp Melanchthon (by Drake), as well as the Marktbrunnen. Since the town administration has been located in the former Tauentzien barracks in Lutherstraße beginning in 2000 (New Town Hall), the town hall on the market square has been called the Old Town Hall and has since served more representative purposes.

Cranach-Höfe 
The Cranach Courts attest to the work of Lucas Cranach the Elder, Lucas Cranach the Younger, Hans Cranach, Augustin Cranach, and Lucas Cranach III in Wittenberg. The building at Markt 4 and the pharmacy with the courtyard at Schlossstraße 1 show points of contact with Lucas Cranach and his descendants.

Lucas Cranach the Elder set up his own print shop in the once-famous printing town of Wittenberg. Among other things, the 95 Theses, the first part of the Luther Bible, Luther's Table Talks, and numerous woodcuts were printed here. After the reconstruction of the Cranach courtyards, a historic print shop was re-established in Schlossstrasse, where texts (e.g. Luther's table speeches) and illustrations (in linocut) are now produced as privately printed matter using the letterpress process. The historical Gutenberg press in the Cranachhof at Markt 4 demonstrates how printing was done in the Middle Ages.

Wittenberg Castle 
Wittenberg Castle is the former residence of the Saxon Electors. After being destroyed in 1760 and 1814, it was used as a barracks as part of the defensive fortifications. Since the First World War, the castle has served civilian purposes.

Museums 
 Cranach-Höfe, Markt 4 (changing exhibitions)
 Altes Rathaus (changing exhibitions)
 Christian Art Foundation Wittenberg with a permanent exhibition and changing special exhibitions in Wittenberg Castle (access via visitor centre)
 Haus der Geschichte (20th century housing culture and in particular that of the former GDR), Schlossstraße 6
 Museum of Municipal Collections in the Zeughaus (city history; Julius Riemer collection: natural history, ethnology), Arsenalplatz
 Science Center futurea, Markt 25
 Historical City Information and burial place of the Ascanians in the monastery church, Arsenalplatz

Other sights 
 Luthereiche at the southern end of Lutherstraße, where Martin Luther burned the Bull of Banishment of the Pope in 1520, thus completing his separation from the Roman Catholic Church.
 Röhrwasser, historical water supply system. In the 16th century, the steady growth of the population of the town of Wittenberg made a supply of fresh and clear water increasingly necessary. The existing wells and streams were no longer sufficient, as they were increasingly polluted with rubbish. The tubewater changed all that. With the tube water connection, fresh spring water was available to the citizens day and night, summer and winter. It was not until 1883 that the tubewater lost its importance due to the central water supply. Today, the Wittenberg tube water system with its 20 or so existing wells is the only functioning tube water supply system from the Middle Ages north of the Alps and thus a technical monument. Since 2002, parts of the streams flowing through the town have been opened up.
 Ratsarchiv Wittenberg, Juristentrasse 16.
 Kirchliches Forschungsheim, Friedrichstrasse 1a.
 Luthergarten, park with 270 trees from all over the world near the castle on Kurfürstenring (formerly Hallesche Straße).
 Panoramic circular image Luther 1517 by Yadegar Asisi, Wilhelm-Weber-Straße near the Lutherhaus
 Tierpark Wittenberg (Zoological Garden), Juristenstraße.
 Alaris Butterfly Park, Rothemarkstraße.
 K-Building (Kommandantengebäude), to house the planned study collection of the municipal collections, with attached lecture and conference centre, Juristenstrasse 14
 Reinhard-Heydrich-Monument, a 75-foot-tall statue erected in memory of Reinhard Heydrich

Coat of arms

Wittenberg's civic coat of arms conveys with its various heraldic elements something of the town's history. On 27 June 1293, Wittenberg was granted town rights by Duke Albert II. There then arose a mediaeval town whose highest governing body was its council. This council, known to have existed as early as 1317, was given the job of administering the town in its care through law and legislation, and of handling the town's revenue. For documentation, the administration used its own seal.
One version of what is believed to be the town's oldest town seal, which the council used, and which dated from the first half of the 14th century, set the pattern with its elements for various civic coats of arms down to the present day.

The coat of arms symbolizes, with its crenelated wall and the towers within and each side, a town that was already strongly fortified by 1409.
The two shields in the centre form the coat of arms of the Electorate of Saxony with the Saxon arms on the right, whose gold and black stripes recall the Ascanian rulers' house colours with the 
Rautenkranz or crancelin (literally "rue wreath"; see the Saxony article for more) across them symbolizing the town's founder Duke Albrecht II since 1262, when it appeared in his arms.
The shield on the left is the Wittenberg district's arms. In 1356, Emperor Charles IV bestowed upon the Duke of Saxony-Wittenberg the honour of Elector. Wittenberg became an Electoral residence. The shield with its crossed swords stands for the office of "Arch-Marshal of the Holy Roman Empire" inextricably joined by the Electorate, brought to Wittenberg by Rudolf I. Both coats of arms continued to be used by the Wettins after the Ascanians died out.
The flowing water at the foot of the shield symbolizes Wittenberg's location on the River Elbe.
The fish is a salmon, which were once abundant in the Elbe. The fishermen, like all professions in town, got their own order in 1422, and the fish found its way onto their coat of arms.

Economy and infrastructure
The whole area of the industrial park covers more than 220 hectares with more than 1,500 workers. Wittenberg is also the headquarters of the eco-friendly web search engine Ecosia. Tourism plays a major role. Wittenberg is one of the top destinations in Saxony-Anhalt.

Lutherstadt Wittenberg station is the main railway station. It connects Wittenberg hourly with Berlin to the north and Leipzig and Halle (Saale) to the south. The station was rebuilt to be more environmentally friendly and re-opened in December 2016.

Theatre, culture and education

Wittenberg has a long tradition of cultural events. The Central German State Theatre (Mitteldeutsches Landestheater) reached a great importance in GDR times. Since 1996, the town has staged open-air theatre shows based on the Lutheran history still alive in many historical places of the ancient town. As highlights, in 2001 and 2005, Fernando Scarpa became the artistic director of the "Bühne Wittenberg" (Stage Wittenberg), a project for theatre, art and culture in the whole of Germany which attracts many visitors to the town and whose success is known European-wide. On 2002 and 2003 Stefano Vagnini, Italian composer and organist created the music for Thesys and Luther Stories. Prince Hamlet is said to have studied in Wittenberg and it was the supposed home of Dr. Faustus.

Wittenberg is seat of the Leucorea which is part of the Martin Luther University of Halle-Wittenberg, the largest university in Saxony-Anhalt.

Personalities from the 19th to the 21st century 
Not only the great men of the Reformation era Martin Luther, Philipp Melanchthon and Lucas Cranach left their mark on Wittenberg. Much more than in its role as the capital of Kursachsen and as the residential town of Saxony-Wittenberg, the city was shaped by what was probably the most important university in Central Europe at the end of the Middle Ages. It was the place of work of many personalities, who at the same time exerted influence on the city. Today, the names and dates of many personalities are recorded on memorial plaques on the houses in the old town.

1801–1850 
 Johann Friedrich von Brandt (* 1802 in Jüterbog; † 1879 in Merreküll), medical doctor and naturalist
 Friedrich Drake (* 1805 in Pyrmont; † 1882 in Berlin), sculptor
 Friedrich Wilhelm Ritschl (* 1806 in Großvargula; † 1876 in Leipzig), philologist.
 Johann Hinrich Wichern (* 1808 in Hamburg; † 1881 in Hamburg), theologian
 Johann Gottfried Galle (* 1812 in Pabsthaus; † 1910 in Potsdam), astronomer
 Werner von Siemens (* 1816 in Lenthe; † 1892 Berlin), industrialist, founder of electrical engineering
 Karl Wilhelm Nitzsch (* 1818 in Zerbst; † 1880 in Berlin), historian
 Adalbert Falk (* 1827 in Metschkau; † 1900 in Hamm), Prussian minister of culture, honorary citizen of Wittenberg

1851–1900 
 Karl Lamprecht (* 1856 in Jessen; † 1915 in Leipzig), historian
 Nathan Söderblom (* 1866 in Trönö; † 1931 in Uppsala), theologian, Nobel Peace Prize laureate, honorary citizen of Wittenberg
 Otto Kleinschmidt (* 1870 in Geinsheim 1870; † 1954 in Wittenberg), natural scientist.
 Otto Dibelius (* 1880 in Berlin; † 1967 in Berlin), theologian
 Julius Riemer (* 1880 in Berlin; 1958 in Wittenberg), museum founder
 Else Hertzer (*1884 in Wittenberg; † 1978 in Berlin), expressionist painter
 Otto Rasch (* 1891 in Friedrichsruh; † 1948 in Nuremberg), Lord Mayor 1934–36, as commander of Einsatzgruppe C responsible, among other things, for the massacre of Babyn Yar
 Hermann Oberth (* 1894 in Hermannstadt; † 1989 in Nuremberg), nuclear physicist

1901–1945 
 Erwin Wickert (* 1915 in Bralitz; † 2008 in Remagen), diplomat and writer
 Konrad Wolf (* 1925 in Hechingen; † 1982 in Berlin), director
 Ezard Haußmann (* 1935 in Potsdam; † 2010 in Potsdam), actor
 Wolfgang Böhmer (* 1936 in Dürrhennersdorf), medical doctor, former Minister President of Saxony-Anhalt
 Friedrich Schorlemmer (* 1944 in Wittenberge), theologian.

After 1945 
 Reiner Haseloff (* 1954 in Bülzig), politician (CDU), Minister-President of Saxony-Anhalt since 2011.
 Frank Wartenberg (* 1955 in Prenzlau), track and field athlete
 Christiane Wartenberg (* 1956 in Prenzlau), track and field athlete
 Peter Fitzek (* 1965 in Halle an der Saale), activist of the Reich citizenship movement, founder of the fantasy state Kingdom of Germany
 Fernando Scarpa (* 1968 in Milan), Italian film director
 Nils Seethaler (* 1981 in Berlin), provenance researcher and museum initiator

Twin towns – sister cities

Wittenberg is twinned with:

 Göttingen, Germany (1988)
 Bretten, Germany (1990)
 Springfield, United States (1995)
 Békéscsaba, Hungary (1999)
 Haderslev, Denmark (2004)
 Beveren, Belgium (2019)
 Mediaș, Romania (2019)
 Mogilev, Belarus (2019)

Gallery

Notes

References

Further reading

External links

Luther Memorials in Eisleben and Wittenberg UNESCO Official Website
Municipal website
Wittenberg Photo Gallery
Theatre of Wittenberg 
Theatre of Wittenberg 
Info on the camp typhus epidemic in World War One
Luther and the Chemicals Industry, a 2013 documentary in English by Deutsche Welle covering the history of the city

 
Landmarks in Germany
Towns in Saxony-Anhalt
Martin Luther
World Heritage Sites in Germany
Wittenberg (district)
Populated riverside places in Germany
Populated places on the Elbe